Brothers is an upcoming American comedy film directed by Max Barbakow from a screenplay by Etan Cohen and Macon Blair. The film stars Josh Brolin and Peter Dinklage as the titular siblings and is produced by Legendary Pictures. The film will be released by Sony Pictures Releasing.

Cast
 Josh Brolin
 Peter Dinklage
 Taylour Paige
 Glenn Close
 Brendan Fraser
 William Tokarsky

Production
On February 28, 2019, it was announced that Legendary Entertainment had purchased the project in a competitive bidding war, with Etan Cohen set to write the screenplay. Josh Brolin and Peter Dinklage were attached to star in the film as well as produce alongside Andrew Lazar. The film was said to be tonally in vein of Twins directed by Ivan Reitman, which centred on two unlikely twins played by Arnold Schwarzenegger and Danny DeVito. 

Macon Blair was later attached to direct the film and co-write the script with Cohen on April 30, 2020. 

On June 3, 2021, Glenn Close joined the main cast, with Palm Springss Max Barbakow directing. Two months later, Brendan Fraser and Taylour Paige were added to the main cast.

Principal photography took place in August 2021 in Atlanta.

Release 
The film will be released by Sony Pictures Releasing.

References

External links
 

American comedy films
Films about brothers
Films shot in Atlanta
Films with screenplays by Etan Cohen
Legendary Pictures films
Upcoming English-language films
Upcoming films